The Big Buddha is a large bronze statue of Buddha, completed in 1993, and located at Ngong Ping, Lantau Island, in Hong Kong. The statue is sited near Po Lin Monastery and symbolises the harmonious relationship between man and nature, people and faith. It is a major centre of Buddhism in Hong Kong, and is also a tourist attraction.

Description
The statue's base is a model of the Altar of Heaven or Earthly Mount of Tian Tan, the Temple of Heaven in Beijing. One of the five large Buddha statues in China, it is enthroned on a lotus on top of a three-platform altar. Surrounding it are six smaller bronze statues known as "The Offering of the Six Devas" that are posed offering flowers, incense, lamp, ointment, fruit, and music to the Buddha. These symbolise the Six Perfections of generosity, morality, patience, zeal, meditation, and wisdom, all of which are necessary for enlightenment.

In addition to the exterior components, there is a strong steel framework inside to support the heavy load. Visitors have to climb 268 steps to reach the Buddha, though the site also features a small winding road for vehicles to provide access for disabled people. The Buddha's right hand is raised, representing the removal of affliction, while the left rests open on his lap in a gesture of generosity.

There are also three floors beneath the statue: the halls of the Universe, of Benevolent Merit and of Remembrance. One of the most renowned features inside is a relic of Gautama Buddha, consisting of some of his alleged cremated remains. Only visitors who purchase an offering for the Buddha are allowed to see the relic, entering to leave it there. There is a huge carved bell inscribed with images of Buddhas in the show room.

History
The Big Buddha was constructed beginning in 1990, and was finished on 29 December 1993, which the Chinese reckon as the day of the Buddha's enlightenment. When the statue was completed, monks from around the world were invited to the opening ceremony. Distinguished visitors from mainland China, Hong Kong, Taiwan, India, Japan, Korea, Thailand, Malaysia, Singapore, Sri Lanka, and the United States all took part in the proceedings.

On 18 October 1999, the Hong Kong Post Office issued a definitive issue of landmark stamps, of which the HK$2.50 value depicts The Big Buddha. On 22 May 2012, it was also featured on the HK$3 value of the Five Festival set, this one celebrating the birth of Sakyamuni Buddha.

Visiting and access

Po Lin Monastery and the Buddha are open to the public between 10:00 and 17:30. Access to the outside of the Buddha is free of charge, but there is an admission fee to go inside the Buddha.

Visitors can reach the site by bus or taxi, travelling first to Mui Wo (also known as "Silvermine Bay") via ferry from the Outlying Islands piers in Central (pier No. 6) or to Tung Chung station via the MTR, or cable car. Visitors may then travel to and from the Buddha via the following bus routes:

Mui Wo ↔ Ngong Ping — NLB No. 2
Tung Chung ↔ Ngong Ping – NLB No. 23

The Ngong Ping 360 gondola lift between Tung Chung and Ngong Ping (25 minutes).

See also
 Laykyun Sekkya
 Great Buddha of Thailand
 Buddha Dordenma statue
 Great Buddha
 Buddhist art
 Chinese Buddhism

References

External links

About the top 5 biggest Buddha statues in China
Pictures of the Po Lin Monastery and the Tian Tan Buddha
 
Video of the climb up the steps to Tian Tan Buddha

Buddhism in Hong Kong
Colossal Buddha statues
Bronze Buddha statues
Landmarks in Hong Kong
Ngong Ping
Tourist attractions in Hong Kong
1993 establishments in Hong Kong